Paknga Bage is an Indian politician from the state of Arunachal Pradesh.

Bage was elected from the Dumporijo constituency in the 2014 Arunachal Pradesh Legislative Assembly election, standing as an Independent candidate.

See also
Arunachal Pradesh Legislative Assembly

References

External links
 Paknga Bage profile
 MyNeta Profile

Living people
Arunachal Pradesh MLAs 2014–2019
Year of birth missing (living people)